Reckiacarus is a genus of mites in the family Acaridae.

Species
 Reckiacarus anakopeiensis G.Kadzhaya, 1972

References

Acaridae